Rationing in Cuba is organized by the government and implemented by means of a Libreta de Abastecimiento ("Supplies booklet") assigned to every individual. The system establishes the amounts of subsidized rations each person is allowed to receive through the system, and the frequency at which supplies can be obtained. While the food rations are not free, the ration fees are a small fraction of the actual price of the goods (on average, less than $2 USD for a month of rations, which is approximately 12% of their market value). Purchases of the goods can also be made outside of the system.

Despite past rumors of ending, the system still exists. As of 2012, a coupon book taken to a ration shop provided family minimums for rice, sugar, matches, and oil, above the average wage of $30/month. While most Cubans do not have to pay for rent, healthcare, or education, ration fees often take up a large percentage of their monthly income, and the unsubsidized costs of their monthly rations would be greater than the average monthly income. The amount of food provided to each citizen has decreased somewhat over time due to the end of billions in yearly financial support from the USSR, a drastic reduction of tens of thousands of subsidized petroleum barrels from Venezuela, and according to government officials, increased sanctions from the United States, and there have been significant increases in the ration fees at times. Economic mismanagement has also played a large role in food shortages and rationing, even while the USSR subsidized the Island to the tune of $5 billion per year, certain food items still had to be rationed. 

All citizens are still provided with subsidized rations today, even those who could otherwise afford to purchase food. President Raul Castro said in 2011 that the subsidies are far too costly for the Cuban government, involving more than $1 billion USD in food subsidies every year, and that he would like to eliminate the system and its "unbearable burden for the economy" which he claimed produces "a disincentive to work". These remarks were received very negatively among Cubans, and Castro eventually reversed his proposal.

More strenuous rationing on food and other basics was imposed in May 2019 due to the country's economic problems, which resulted largely from a stiffening U.S. embargo, the loss of aid from Venezuela, and difficulties with the state-run oil company.

Overview

The vast majority of Cuban families rely, for their food intake, on the Libreta de Abastecimiento (literally, "Supplies booklet") distribution system, instated on 12 March 1962. The system establishes the rations each person is allowed to buy through the system, and the frequency of supplies. Most of these products are distributed at the local bodega (convenience store specialized in distributing these rations), and in the case of meat, poultry or  fish, at the local carnicería (meat store). Other industrial products are also included in the libreta, such as cigarettes, cigars, matches and cooking fuels (liquified gas, alcohol, kerosene or even charcoal, depending on each person's means for cooking). Other products can also be distributed through this method, such as light bulbs and other home supplies.

Products included in the libreta vary according to age and sex. For example, children below 7 years old are provided 1 litre of milk per day, as are the elderly, the ill, and pregnant women. Adults above 65 years are entitled to different allowances, as well. Granting a special diet requires presentation of a medical certificate which confirms the health condition and what product requirements this condition has.

A Government office, specially created for this task, the OFICODA, distributes the libreta to all citizens each year, in the form of a small booklet. This booklet contains pages indicating the exact number and age groups of persons composing the family nucleus (typically, one booklet is released per family nucleus), as well as any dietary indications. A person's products are distributed only at the bodega that serves their area of official residence. A person cannot receive their products somewhere else, so each change of address requires returning to the OFICODA to update the booklet's data, and those living away from their registered addresses have to return to the previous area for their supplies.

Products distributed through the libreta mechanism are sold at subsidized prices, which have been kept more or less stable since its inception (the mean salary of a worker has varied very little since, as well). The libreta contains a page for every month, where the clerk marks what products were withdrawn, and in which quantities. Cubans are required to present the libreta each time they buy the rations.

At its inception, the rationing system included not only food products, but industrial products as well. Along with the libreta, a tear-off coupon booklet was distributed, whose purpose was to set the allowances for industrial products, mainly clothing, shoes, and home products, as well as rationing the toys sold to families with children (which were allowed 3 different toys per child per year, usually sold near or on 6 January, Three Kings Day, or Día de Reyes). After the demise of the Eastern Bloc in 1991, Cuba entered the "Special Period" and industrial products were no longer distributed through this system.

A specific set of laws regulate the functioning of the system, as well as establishing penalties for its misuse. Most irregularities deal with clerks not recording products in the booklet, or recording them incorrectly, and the weighing of the products distributed. Citizens could be legally liable if they do not promptly inform the local OFICODA of any changes in the composition of the family nucleus.

Standard rations

A table follows that illustrates the standard ration distributed through this system. Figures are per person, per month. An indication of the subsidized prices is given, as well. Allowances vary from year to year, so these should be understood as approximate figures, based on data from 2000:

Meat products are distributed separately, if available, following a different rationale. These are distributed every 15 days, and usually rotate (that is, the product type changes on each delivery). Fish, beef, ground beef (usually mixed with soy), chicken, sausages and ham fall in this category. Quantities, and prices, differ for each meat product (beef, ½ lb/person each 15 days, whereas chicken is 1 lb/person every 15 days).

It must be said that distribution is not always prompt, and product delivery is frequently delayed (for example, if one month there were no beans to distribute, they usually cumulate for next month, although this is not always the case). Such delays are most evident in beef distribution. The fact that products are not available at the bodega always, but arrive in a more or less random manner, creates long queues when products arrive, which sometimes makes buying the products a quite lengthy process. So, this required a mechanism to be invented so that people with special needs, such as old persons and pregnant women, had precedence on the queue. This mechanism became known as Plan Jaba. Jaba is a word for a flexible basket or bag taken from the vocabulary of Neo-Taino nations and originally was made of dried woven strips from palm fronds.

It was estimated in the early 2000s that the rationing covered between one third and one half of a family's needs.

President Raul Castro moved to eliminate many products from the rationing system, including potatoes and peas.

Other sources

The libreta is not the only means of acquiring goods available to a Cuban citizen, as many of these and other products are freely available on the mercado libre (free market) and mercado paralelo (parallel market), and in the numerous supermarkets and stores that sell goods in convertible pesos. (Such stores were originally set up taking United States Dollars and were referred to as "dollar stores". They began catering for foreign visitors but many are used mainly by Cubans). In addition, Cuba has an active black market (mercado negro, often described as por la izquierda – by the left hand) in many goods. Black market goods may be simply items sold by unlicensed vendors (for example, fish caught and sold directly, or home-made items), or may be stolen goods. Many Cubans rely upon connections and barter, or "sociolismo", to obtain the items they need.

Government justification for the rationing

The Cuban government states this method of distribution serves to ensure each citizen a minimum intake of food, regardless of the person's social and economical status, and has publicized plans for its demise (although specific dates have not been provided). It also stresses that the libreta is not the only means of acquiring goods available to a Cuban citizen, as these and other products are freely available on the mercado libre and mercado paralelo, and of course in the numerous supermarkets and stores that sell goods in convertible pesos or euros. The prices in the ration book are about 20 times lower than the free market. It says as well that humanitarian aid received from other countries is distributed through this method in a fair and equitable manner. The official stance on this subject is that of being undesirable, but unavoidable and fair.

The government also says that rations are not used for political leverage, and distributes the subsidized food equally to all citizens, regardless of their political views or judicial status. However residents and refugees from Cuba report that their rationing books were taken away when they were perceived to be anti-revolutionary.

Criticisms

Detractors question the fairness of this method as well as its purpose, and stress its deficiencies, such as a historical decrement of the delivery frequency and quantities of goods distributed and, in their opinion, this method creates profound economical differences within the Cuban people, dividing the country in half: those who can afford the higher prices of goods in convertible pesos or in the mercado libre, and those that simply cannot.
They stress, as well, the fact that the measure was adopted by the Cuban government in 1962 as a temporary palliative to a crisis and has lasted for more than fifty years.

Additional rationing in 2019
In May 2019, Cuba imposed rationing of staples such as chicken, eggs, rice, beans, soap and other basics (Some two-thirds of food in the country is imported). A spokesperson blamed the increased U.S. trade embargo although economists believe that an equally important problem is the massive decline of aid from Venezuela and the failure of Cuba's state-run oil company which had subsidized fuel costs.

See also

Rationing
Rationing in the Soviet Union
Rationing in the United Kingdom
Economy of Cuba
Cuban Cuisine
Culture of Cuba
Sociolismo

References

Economy of Cuba
Cuba
Regulation in Cuba